Jacques Mitterrand (10 June 1908 – 5 June 1991) was the Grand Master of the Grand Orient de France and a founder of the small left wing party Union progressiste.

Mitterrand was born in  Bourges. He was a member of the Council of the French Union between 1947 and 1958.

References

1908 births
1991 deaths
Politicians from Bourges
Radical Party (France) politicians
Union progressiste politicians
French Freemasons
Officiers of the Légion d'honneur
Recipients of the Croix de Guerre 1939–1945 (France)
Recipients of the Resistance Medal